Yurie (ゆりえ, ユリエ) is a feminine Japanese given name.

Possible writings
 由理恵, "reason, logic, blessing"
 由梨恵, "reason, pear, blessing"
 友里絵, "friend, hometown, picture"
 友里恵, "friend, hometown, blessing"
 友理恵, "friend, logic, blessing"
 友理枝, "friend, logic, branch"
 友利恵, "friend, profit, blessing"
 有里枝, "exist, hometown, branch"
 百合枝, "lily, branch"
The name can also be written in hiragana or katakana.

People
 , Japanese ice hockey player
 , paralympic cross-country skier 
 , ex-member of AKB48
 Yurie Kato (born 1987), Japanese triathlete
 , Japanese voice actress
 , Japanese sailor
 , Japanese voice actress
 , Japanese actress and gravure idol
 , Japanese pianist and actress
 , Japanese volleyball player
 , Japanese photographer
 Yurie Oda, figure skater
 , Japanese television reporter and news anchor
 , Japanese biathlete
 , Japanese freestyle skier
 Yurie Yano, freestyle swimmer 
Yurie Hoyoyon, Voice actress, voice of Mobile Legends Bang Bang (Guinevere) ゆりえほよよん　声優

Fictional characters
  of Kamichu!
  of Ping Pong (manga)

See also
 Yuriko (disambiguation)

Japanese feminine given names